Newmansville is an unincorporated community in Cass County, Illinois, United States.

References

Unincorporated communities in Cass County, Illinois
Unincorporated communities in Illinois